Jammit is a 1994 video game for the 3DO, MS-DOS, Sega Genesis and Super Nintendo Entertainment System. It was developed by GTE Vantage and published by GTE Entertainment.

Gameplay
The game features arcade-styled 1-on-1 street basketball, like NBA Jam or Arch Rivals. Player can choose from three playable characters.

Reception
Quick-Draw McGraw of GamePro reviewed that the 3DO version has better graphics and audio than the earlier Genesis and SNES versions, but not to the extent that one would expect from the far more powerful hardware. He also criticized the jerkiness of the characters' moves, but acknowledged that there were very few street-ball games to offer competition, especially on the 3DO. A reviewer for Next Generation gave it two out of five stars, likewise stating that the 3DO version fails to offer significant enhancement over the versions on less powerful consoles. He added that "in the end though, what kills this one is that the controls are so sluggish you'd think your Nikes had melted to the blacktop".

References

External links

1994 video games
3DO Interactive Multiplayer games
Basketball video games
DOS games
North America-exclusive video games
Sega Genesis games
Super Nintendo Entertainment System games
Multiplayer and single-player video games
Video games developed in the United States
Virgin Interactive games